This is a list of banks in Canada, including chartered banks, credit unions, trusts, and other financial services companies that offer banking services and may be popularly referred to as "banks".

The "Big Five" 

Canada's "big five" banks, and a few statistics (2013):

The term "Big Six" is frequently used as well and includes the National Bank of Canada (2013 market cap of $8.9B), though its operations are primarily focused in the provinces of Quebec and New Brunswick.

Banks by legal classification
Banks in Canada are classified by their ownership as domestic banks, subsidiaries of foreign banks, or branches of foreign banks. For a greater explanation of the classifications, see Banking in Canada and Canada Bank Act.

Schedule I banks (domestic banks)
Under the Canada Bank Act, Schedule I are banks that are not a subsidiary of a foreign bank, i.e., domestic banks, even if they have foreign shareholders. There are 34 domestic banks, included 2 federally regulated Credit Unions as of December 31st, 2022.

Schedule II banks (subsidiaries of foreign banks) 

Schedule II banks are banks allowed to accept deposits and which are subsidiaries of a foreign bank. As of December 2022, there were 15 of these banks in Canada.

Schedule III banks (branches of foreign banks)

Full service 
The following banks are not authorized to accept deposits in Canada of less than $150,000. As of August 2016, there were 28 such banks in Canada.

Lending only 
The following banks are prohibited from accepting deposits or borrowing money except from financial institutions. There were four such banks in Canada as of August 2016.

Government-owned financial institutions

 Bank of Canada (Central Bank)
 Business Development Bank of Canada
 Farm Credit Canada – Government-owned Farm Credit is not a deposit-taking bank.  It is, however, a major lender to the agriculture and agri-food industries.
 ATB Financial (Government of Alberta Crown Corporation)

Credit unions 

Canada has a strong co-operative financial services sector, which consists of credit unions (caisses populaires in Quebec and other French speaking regions).  At the end of 2001 Canada's credit union sector consisted of 681 credit unions and 914 caisses populaires, with more than 3,600 locations and 4,100 automated teller machines. By the end of 2019, consolidation reduced this number to 251 credits unions and caisses populaires outside Quebec, according to the Canadian Credit Union Association (CCUA). Canada has the world's highest per capita membership in the credit union movement, with over 10 million members, or about one-third of the Canadian population.  While the sector is active in all parts of the country, it is strongest in the western provinces and in Quebec. In Quebec 70 per cent of the population belongs to a caisse populaire, while in Saskatchewan close to 60 per cent belongs to a credit union.

Credit unions outside Quebec 
As of 31 December 2021, the 220 credit unions and caisses populaires outside Quebec reported combined assets of $292.3 billion:

Desjardins 
Most caisses populaires in Quebec (and some outside the province) are part of a network which operates as the Desjardins Group. Desjardins Group owns and operates a range of subsidiaries, including a securities brokerage, a venture capital firm, and a bank based in Florida.

As of 31 December 2015, Desjardins Group's consolidated assets totalled $248.1 billion CAD.

Defunct and merged banks

Credit agencies
 Equifax Canada
 TransUnion Canada

See also

 Banking in Canada
 Credit unions in Canada
 Canada Deposit Insurance Corporation
 Routing number (Canada)
 Canada Bank Company
 ATB Financial
 List of financial regulatory authorities by country

References

External links
 http://www.osfi-bsif.gc.ca/Eng/wt-ow/Pages/wwr-er.aspx List of banks regulated by the Office of the Superintendent of Financial Institutions
 List of Canadian banks via the Canada Revenue Agency website
 Credit Union Central of Canada's Publications
 Bank locations in Canada
 List of banks in Canada
 Information about Banks in Canada

 Lists
Canada
Banking in Canada
banks
Canada
Credit unions of Canada